The Abbey of San Pedro el Viejo is a former Benedictine monastery in the old town of Huesca, Aragon, Spain.

History
The present Romanesque structure was built by the Benedictines in the 12th century. The name "San Pedro el Viejo", or "Saint Peter the Old", refers to the fact that the Visigothic monastery building that was given to them predated the Moorish occupation.

The site now consists mostly of the cloisters and the church. It has been a national monument since 1886, and is one of the most important buildings for the Romanesque architecture of Aragon.

The abbey celebrated the 900th anniversary of its construction in 2017.

The former chapter room has been since the 13th century the Chapel of San Benito or Royal Pantheon (Panteón Real) and contains the tombs of two kings of Aragon: Alfonso I, the Battler, and his brother and successor Ramiro II, the Monk.

Architecture

The building has two main parts: the church and the cloister.

The church consists of three ships and their apses. The altarpiece is polychrome wood by Juan de Ali (artist Navarre) in the early 17th century. The church chapels surrounding the show interesting artwork from different periods:
Altarpiece of the Virgin of Hope (16th century). Renaissance.
Altarpiece of Saints Just and Pastor (17th century). Baroque.
Altarpiece of the Annunciation (15th-16th century). Gothic.
13th century murals.
Wooden choir stalls (17th century)

In culture
Javier Sierra's novel The Invisible Fire ("El fuego invisible"), which won the Premio Planeta de Novela, featured San Pedro el Viejo prominently.

See also
Order of St. Benedict

References

External links
 
 
 Monasterio de San Pedro el Viejo. Huesca at Arteguias.com

Monasteries in Aragon
Benedictine monasteries in Spain
Abbey of San Pedro el Viejo
Abbey of San Pedro el Viejo
Christian monasteries established in the 12th century